Pier Francesco Meglia (3 November 1810 – 31 March 1883) was an Italian prelate of the Catholic Church, who spent his career in the diplomatic service of the Holy See. He was made a cardinal in 1879.

Biography
Pier Francesco Meglia was born in Santo Stefano al Mare on 3 November 1810. He studied at the seminaries of Genoa and Savona and then in Rome at La Sapienza University, where he earned a doctorate in civil and canon law on 23 May 1843.

He was ordained a priest in Rome on 24 September 1836.

He entered the diplomatic service of the Holy See. His early postings included stints as secretary of the nunciature in Naples at the court of the Kingdom of the Two Sicilies, auditor and then chargé d'affaires of the nunciature in France.

He was named titular archbishop of Damascus on 22 September 1864. He received his episcopal consecration on 25 September 1864 from Pope Pius IX. He was appointed apostolic delegate to Mexico on 1 October 1864 when the Holy See and the Mexican government were at loggerheads. Recent legislation calling for the seizure of Church property, the abolition of religious orders, and freedom of religion was awaiting only promulgation by the Emperor. Mexican Emperor Maximilian I hoped to negotiate a compromise concordat while the Holy See sought the full restoration of the status quo ante. Efforts at negotiation collapsed by yearend, and the reform laws were decreed in February. Meglia delayed his departure until May, but took the nunciature's archives with him.

His next assignment was Apostolic Nuncio to the Kingdom of Bavaria on 26 October 1866. 

He was named Apostolic Nuncio to France on 10 July 1874. He crowned the statue of Our Lady of Lourdes on 3 July 1876.

Pope Leo XIII made him a cardinal of the order of cardinal priests on 19 September 1879. He received his red galero and the title of Santi Silvestro e Martino ai Monti on 27 February 1880.

He was made a member of the Council for the Administration of the Wealth of the Apostolic See on 21 December 1880.

He died in Rome on 31 March 1883.

References

External links
 
 

1810 births
1883 deaths
People from the Province of Imperia
Apostolic Nuncios to France
Apostolic Nuncios to Bavaria
Apostolic Nuncios to Mexico
Cardinals created by Pope Leo XIII
19th-century Italian cardinals